The UMass Minutemen Ice Hockey team is a National Collegiate Athletic Association (NCAA) Division I men's college ice hockey program that represents the University of Massachusetts Amherst. The Minutemen are a member of Hockey East. They play at the 8,387-seat William D. Mullins Memorial Center (known as the Mullins Center) in Amherst, Massachusetts.

History

Pond history
The centrally located pond on the UMass campus was once used for multiple purposes. In the winter students and faculty would cut out blocks of ice to use for refrigeration and annual tug-of-war games between sophomores and freshmen were hosted during the spring months. In 1909 the first formal ice hockey team began playing on the pond as well. UMass fielded one of the earliest non-ivy league programs, playing continually until poor weather conditions and a lack of funding caused the team to cease in 1939. The Minutemen were able to return to the ice after the war but couldn't play at home until 1954. 

The lack of a home venue caused the team to suffer through a stretch where they won only 2 games over a 7-year period. Eventually the pond became usable again and UMass were able to play home games with new head coach Steve Kosakowski. The Minutemen performed decently in his 13 seasons and were among 28 teams to found ECAC Hockey. In 1964 the ECAC split into two divisions and any program that did not possess a dedicated indoor arena was placed in ECAC 2. UMass continued with the second-tier conference for 15 years and achieved their greatest success in 1972 under Jack Canniff, winning the conference tournament title.

By the end of the 1970s using the pond as a rink had become untenable and when no alternatives surfaced the program was shuttered.

Return to the Ice
When the Mullins Center opened in 1993 it was designed as a multi-purpose arena and allowed for the university to rekindle its ice hockey program. The men's team started the same year and hit the ice as a Division I independent. With 20 wins in the first season under Joe Mallen, there was hope that the Minutemen could compete in Hockey East. However, once they began a tougher schedule in 1994–95, the team lost a then-school-record 28 games. Though the team rarely finished last in the conference under Mallen, there were very few gains and he was replaced by Don Cahoon in 2000.

Under Cahoon the team began to improve, posting a winning season in 2003 and reaching the conference championship game the following year. His greatest success came after recruiting Jonathan Quick, who helped UMass to reach their first ever NCAA Tournament in 2007. Cahoon couldn't keep the success going, however, and after being knocked off in five consecutive conference quarterfinals he retired in 2012.

John Micheletto was tabbed as Cahoon's successor and after a decent first season the team slid down the standing and bottomed out for two consecutive seasons. After the second last-place finish Micheletto was fired and replaced by St. Lawrence head coach Greg Carvel.

Greg Carvel era (2016–present)
In Carvel's first season the team reached a nadir; the Minutemen set a new program record for futility, losing 29 games. Carvel led the team to a much-improved finish in his second season and then team took off in year three. The Minutemen reached their first ever Frozen Four and a berth in the 2019 NCAA Division I National Championship in which the Minutemen ultimately lost to Minnesota-Duluth 3–0. Though the year ended on a sour note, the team posted a new program record for wins (31) while Cale Makar won the school's first Hobey Baker Award.

On April 10, 2021, the Minutemen won their first-ever NCAA Division I Men's Ice Hockey Tournament, beating the St. Cloud State Huskies 5–0.

Season-by-season results

Source:

Records vs. current Hockey East teams
As of the completion of 2018–19 season

Coaches and support staff
Current as of November, 2018.

Head Coach History
As of the completion of 2020–21 season

Statistical leaders
Source:

Career points leaders

† - active

Career goaltending leaders

GP = Games played; Min = Minutes played; W = Wins; L = Losses; T = Ties; GA = Goals against; SO = Shutouts; SV% = Save percentage; GAA = Goals against average

Minimum 30 games played

Statistics current through the start of the 2022–23 season.

Current roster
As of August 6, 2022.

The Longest Game
On March 6, 2015, UMass faced Notre Dame in Game 1 of the Opening Round of the 2015 Hockey East Men's Ice Hockey Tournament, played at Compton Family Ice Arena at Notre Dame. Early into the game, Sam Herr gave Notre Dame the lead on a rebounded shot. Vince Hinostroza made it 2–0 midway through the second period. But the Minutmen responded two minutes later with a power play goal by Steven Iacobellis. Notre Dame responded three minutes later with a Steven Fogarty goal to make it 3–1. UMass made it 3–2 a minute later with a goal by Shane Walsh. With two seconds remaining in the period, Troy Power tipped a power play goal to tie the game as the second period (a period that had five goals in total) ended. The third period ended with no goals, as the two teams went into overtime. The two teams repeatedly failed to score, with UMass shooting a record 91 times and Notre Dame shooting 78 times. With 8:18 left in the fifth overtime and at 1:24 a.m. ET, Shane Walsh scored the game-winning goal to end the longest Division I hockey game which had lasted 151 minutes, 42 seconds, besting the previous record of 150:22, set by Quinnipiac and Union in 2010.

Steve Mastalerz finished the night with 75 saves for UMass while Cal Petersen of Notre Dame made 87 saves, setting a new NCAA record. It was UMass' first win at the Tournament since March 13, 2009 at Northeastern.

Awards and honors

NCAA

Individual awards

Hobey Baker Award
Cale Makar: 2019

Edward Jeremiah Award
Jack Canniff: 1972

Spencer Penrose Award
Greg Carvel: 2019

NCAA Tournament Most Outstanding Player
Bobby Trivigno: 2021

All-Americans
AHCA First Team All-Americans

1971–72: Pat Keenan, F; Brian Sullivan, D; P.J. Flaherty, G
1972–73: Pat Keenan, F
2003–04: Thomas Pöck, D
2018–19: Cale Makar, D; Mitchell Chaffee, F
2019–20: John Leonard, F
2020–21: Bobby Trivigno, F
2021–22: Bobby Trivigno, F; Scott Morrow, D

AHCA Second Team All-Americans

2006–07: Jonathan Quick, G
2008–09: James Marcou, F
2009–10: Justin Braun, D
2020–21: Zac Jones, D

NCAA Division I Men's Ice Hockey All-Tournament Team

2018–19: Marc Del Gaizo, D
2020-21: Bobby Trivigno, F; Matthew Kessel, D; Zac Jones, D; Filip Lindberg, G

Hockey East

Individual awards

Player of the Year
Cale Makar: 2019
Bobby Trivigno: 2022

Hockey East Rookie of the Year
Josh Lopina: 2021

Three-Stars Award
John Leonard: 2020

Scoring Champion
James Marcou: 2009 (co-champion)
Mitchell Chaffee: 2019
Bobby Trivigno: 2022

Best Defensive Defenseman
Justin Braun: 2010

Bob Kullen Coach of the Year
Don Cahoon: 2003
Greg Carvel: 2019

William Flynn Tournament Most Valuable Player
Bobby Trivigno: 2021, 2022

All-Hockey East
First Team

2003–04: Thomas Pöck, D
2008–09: James Marcou, F
2009–10: Justin Braun, D
2018–19: Cale Makar, D; Mitchell Chaffee, F
2019–20: John Leonard, F
2020–21: Bobby Trivigno, F
2021–22: Bobby Trivigno, F; Scott Morrow, D

Second Team

2002–03: Thomas Pöck, D
2005–06: Marvin Degon, D
2006–07: Jonathan Quick, G
2007–08: Mike Kostka, D
2008–09: Justin Braun, D
2009–10: James Marcou, F
2018–19: John Leonard, F; Jacob Pritchard, F
2020–21: Filip Lindberg, G; Zac Jones, D
2022–23: Scott Morrow, D; Ryan Ufko, D

Third Team

2017–18: Cale Makar, D
2018–19: Marc Del Gaizo, D; Mario Ferraro, D
2019–20: Jake McLaughlin, D
2020–21: Marc Del Gaizo, D; Matthew Kessel, D
2021–22: Matthew Kessel, D; Matt Murray, G

Rookie Team

1994–95: Brian Regan, G
2002–03: Stephen Werner, D
2004–05: David Leaderer, D; P. J. Fenton, F
2006–07: Justin Braun, D
2007–08: Paul Dainton, G; James Marcou, F
2008–09: Casey Wellman, F
2010–11: Michael Pereira, F
2014–15: Brandon Montour, F
2017–18: Cale Makar, D; Mario Ferraro, D
2018–19: Marc Del Gaizo, D
2019–20: Zac Jones, D
2020–21: Josh Lopina, F
2021–22: Scott Morrow, D; Ryan Ufko, D
2022–23: Kenny Connors, F

All-Tournament Team

2002–03: Thomas Pöck, D; Stephen Werner, F
2003–04: Thomas Pöck, D; Greg Mauldin, F; Mike Warner, F
2006–07: Chris Capraro, F 
2020–21: Filip Lindberg, G; Zac Jones, D; Jake Gaudet, F; Bobby Trivigno, F
2021–22: Matt Murray, G; Colin Felix, D; Garrett Wait, F; Bobby Trivigno, F

Olympians
This is a list of Massachusetts alumni were a part of an Olympic team.

Minutemen in the NHL
As of July 1, 2022

Source:

References

External links
UMass Minutemen men's ice hockey

 
Ice hockey teams in Massachusetts